Binge eating is a pattern of disordered eating which consists of episodes of uncontrollable eating. It is a common symptom of eating disorders such as binge eating disorder and bulimia nervosa. During such binges, a person rapidly consumes an excessive quantity of food.  A diagnosis of binge eating is associated with feelings of loss of control. Binge eating disorder is also linked with being overweight and obesity.

Diagnosis 
The DSM-5 includes a disorder diagnosis criteria for Binge Eating Disorder (BED). It is as follows:

 Recurrent and persistent episodes of binge eating
 Binge eating episodes are associated with three (or more) of the following: 
 Eating much more rapidly than normal
 Eating until feeling uncomfortably full
 Eating large amounts of food when not physically hungry 
 Eating alone because of being embarrassed by how much one is eating
 Feeling disgusted with oneself, depressed, or very guilty after overeating
 Marked distress regarding binge eating 
 Absence of regular compensatory behaviors (such as purging)

Warning signs 
Typical warning signs of binge eating disorder include the disappearance of large amount of foods in relatively short periods of time. A person who may be experiencing binge eating disorder may appear to be uncomfortable when eating around others or in public. A person may develop new and extreme eating patterns that they have never done before. These might include diets that cut out certain food groups completely such as a no dairy or no carb diet. They might also steal or hoard food in unusual places. A person may be experiencing fluctuations in their weight. In addition they may have feelings of disgust, depression, or guilt about over eating. Another possible warning sign of binge eating is that a person may be obsessed with their body image or weight.

Furthermore, patients who binge eat may also engage in other self-destructing behaviours like suicide attempts, drug use, shop-lifting, and drinking too much alcohol.

Causes 
There are no direct causes of binge eating; however, long-term dieting, psychological issues and an obsession with body image have been linked to binge eating. There are multiple factors that increase a person's risk of developing binge eating disorder. Family history can play a role if that person had a family member who was affected by binge eating. Said person may not have a supportive or friendly home environment, and they have a hard time expressing their problems with BED. Having a history of going on extreme diets may cause an urge to binge eat. Psychological issues such as feeling negatively about oneself or the way they look may trigger a binge.

Weight stigma has also been found to predict binge eating, highlighting the importance of weight inclusive approaches to binge eating disorder that do not exercerbate this potential cause.

Health risks 
There are several physical, emotional, and social health risks when associated with binge eating disorder. These risks include depression, anxiety, and heart disease.

One study found that people with obesity who experience binge eating have a higher body mass index, and higher levels of depression and stress than those who did not have with binge eating disorder

Effects
Typically the eating is done rapidly and a person will feel emotionally numb and unable to stop eating. Most people who have eating binges try to hide this behavior from others, and often feel ashamed about being overweight or depressed about their overeating. Although people who do not have any eating disorder may occasionally experience episodes of overeating, frequent binge eating is often a symptom of an eating disorder.

BED is characterized by uncontrollable, excessive eating, followed by feelings of shame and guilt. Unlike those with bulimia, those with BED symptoms typically do not purge their food, fast, or excessively exercise to compensate for binges. Additionally, these individuals tend to diet more often, enroll in weight-control programs and have a history of family obesity. However, many who have bulimia also have binge-eating disorder.

Along with the social and physical health that is effected when suffering from BED, there are psychiatric disorders that are often linked to BED. Some of them being, but are not limited to: 
depression, bipolar disorder, anxiety disorder, substance abuse/use disorder.

Treatments 
Current treatments for binge eating disorder mainly consist of psychological therapies, such as Cognitive Behavioural Therapy (CBT), Interpersonal Psychotherapy (IPT), and Dialectical Behavioural Therapy (DBT). There are currently no effective medications available to treat BED.

History

1959: Binge Eating Disorder First Documentation
Binge Eating Disorder was first documented by psychiatrist Albert Stunkard in his paper “Eating Patterns and Obesity” in 1959. In his paper, Stunkard reports seeing people eating large amounts of food at infrequent rates. He also reported that some of these cases unhealthy eating habits were seen during a time period he called “night eating”. After this report, the terminology of “Binge Eating” caught on for diagnosing the episodes of infrequent eating of large amounts of food, whether or not the episode is connected with night eating.

1987: The APA's DSM
The American Psychiatric Association mentioned and listed Binge Eating under the listed criteria and features of Bulimia in the Diagnostic and Statistical Manual of Mental Disorders (DSM) - 3 in 1987. By including Binge Eating in the DSM-3, even if not on its own as a separate eating disorder, they brought awareness to the disorder and gave it mental disorder legitimacy. This allowed for people to receive the appropriate treatment for binge eating and for their disorder to be legitimized.

2008: The BEDA Form
In 2008 the nonprofit called the Binge Eating Disorder Associated (BEDA) forms in order to help, support, and be an advocate for the Binge Eating Disorder (BED) community. To inform the public and spread the awareness of BED, BEDA holds events throughout the year, holds an annual conference, while also hosting a Weight Stigma Awareness Week which supports BED research.

2013: Full recognition into the DSM
In 2013, when the APA released the newly revised edition of DSM-5, BED is declared as its own (eating) disorder. This official announcement helped legitimize BED. With this proclamation, significant change occurred causing for people who suffer from BED to receive the appropriate treatment they need under their insurance plan.

January 2015: Drug therapy is introduced
In January 2015, the Food and Drug Administration (FDA) approved the drug lisdexamfetamine dimesylate, also known as Vyvanse, for the treatment of BED, allowing for the several who are affected to receive drug related help, on top of outside help. The FDA reported that there were only a few side-effects.

Men with binge eating 

Often research on eating disorder affiliated with binge eating has to do with slimness. However, men tend to measure themselves on masculinity and strength. More research is needed for men regarding this situation, since much research has been done on women.

See also 

 Binge drinking
 Binge eating disorder
 Cognitive behavioral treatment of eating disorders
 Counterregulatory eating
 Overeating
 Polyphagia
 Prader-Willi Syndrome

References

External links 
 

Eating behaviors of humans
Hyperalimentation

de:Binge Eating